Samantha Dodanwela (born 15 September 1970) is a Sri Lankan former first-class cricketer who played for the Sinhalese Sports Club.

Dodanwela was a right-arm opening bowler. His best season was in 1995-96, when he took 57 wickets at an average of 13.96, including his best figures of 4 for 33 and 6 for 44 against Tamil Union.

He was later the chairman of Sinhalese Sports Club, and served on some Sri Lanka Cricket committees. He is a tea taster by profession and is the chief executive officer of Mercantile Produce Brokers (Pvt.) Ltd., a tea brokerage company. He serves on the executive committee of the Colombo Tea Traders' Association and on the tea tasting panel of the Sri Lanka Tea Board.

References

External links
 

1970 births
Living people
Alumni of Trinity College, Kandy
Sri Lankan cricketers
Sinhalese Sports Club cricketers
Sportspeople from Kandy
Businesspeople in tea
Sri Lankan cricket administrators